The Guardian is an American drama television series created by David Hollander for CBS. It originally aired from September 25, 2001, to May 4, 2004. In the United States, as of September 2018, it was being broadcast in re-runs on Heroes & Icons and Paramount+. The Guardian has aired in the United Kingdom on the Hallmark Channel, ABC1 (April 2006) and, more recently, 5USA (May 2009) and Five (August 2009). In Turkey, the show aired on TNT and in Australia on Network Ten; as of 2011 re-runs are airing on the Nine Network following episodes of Simon Baker's 2008–2015 vehicle The Mentalist, but before on free-to-air television, the show has also aired on Foxtel's defunct station TV1 (now TVH!TS) in 2003 during the Saturday Night's Crime Time Block before Law & Order: Criminal Intent and Law & Order: SVU. In India and Pakistan the show airs on Animax from June 2010 and AXN and FX. In Singapore, the show airs on AXN through Starhub Cable Television. In New Zealand, the show airs on Vibe, channel 7, via sky TV. In Latin America, the series premiered in October 2012 on the Sony Spin channel.

The show stars Simon Baker and Dabney Coleman. It includes guest stars, such as Farrah Fawcett, and featured scenes with the Pittsburgh Police in multiple episodes.

Synopsis 
Series protagonist Nick Fallin is a corporate attorney sentenced to 1,500 hours of community service with Legal Services of Pittsburgh (originally Children's Legal Services) as the result of a drug conviction. The plot focuses on Nick's community service as a guardian ad litem and recovery from drug addiction, as well as his strained relationship with his father, who was founder and is managing partner of the corporate law firm where Nick is employed full-time.

Episodes

Cast and characters

Main 
 Simon Baker as Nicholas "Nick" Fallin, a lawyer sentenced to community service for drug-related crimes. The central protagonist, he is a driven individual whose work and relationships are the focus for the series.
 Dabney Coleman as Burton Fallin, Nick's father and the senior partner at the law firm where Nick works. Another central protagonist, the two do not have a close relationship. Starting in season two he fosters Shannon Gressler.
 Alan Rosenberg as Alvin Masterson, the head of Legal Services of Pittsburgh, where Nick serves his community service. Later in the series, Alvin dates Laurie Solt, a social worker.
 Wendy Moniz as Louisa "Lulu" Archer, Nick's de facto boss from mid-season one and his main love interest. She marries another man, but Nick can't seem to move on, partially because she can't seem to either, even after her marriage.
 Raphael Sbarge as Jake Straka, Nick's closest friend and a law colleague.
 Charles Malik Whitfield as James Mooney, an attorney at Legal Services of Pittsburgh and a friend of Nick. He has a gang and drug background. 
 Rusty Schwimmer as Barbara Ludinski, the secretary for Legal Aid where Nick is doing his community service.  Jake has an ongoing somewhat ambiguous relationship with her that teeters on the edge of becoming romantic.  He likes and respects her but he remains tentative. 
 Amanda Michalka as Shannon Gressler, a troubled child. 
 Erica Leerhsen as Amanda Bowles, an ambitious but caring associate. 
 Kathleen Chalfant as Laurie Solt, a hardworking social worker who provides guidance for Nick.

Recurring 
 Denise Dowse as Judge Rebecca Damsen, who presides over the cases in family court

Notable guest stars 
 Farrah Fawcett as Mary Gressler, a troubled grandmother and love interest of Burton Fallin. Appeared in four episodes in season 2.
 Rita Moreno as Caroline Novak, mother of Lulu (Louise Archer played by Wendy Moniz), for three episodes in 2003.
 Lolita Davidovich as Victoria Little, a social welfare advocate and love interest of Alvin Masterson. Appeared in two episodes.
 Zac Efron appears in episode 15 of season 3.
 Bethany Joy Galeotti as Claire Stasiak. Appeared in two episodes: "What It Means to You" and "My Aim Is True".
 Chris Pine as a troubled teen, Lonnie Grandy, in the season 3 episode "Hazel Park".
 Will Ferrell, credited as "Phil Weston", in a cameo appearance as Larry Flood, a new lawyer at LSP, in the season 2 finale, "All the Rage".
 Corey Feldman as a former child actor, Gavin Putinski, in season 2's "You Belong to Me".
 Erik Estrada made a cameo appearance in a restaurant in season 3, episode 18, "The Bachelor Party".
 Joseph Campanella as Ralph Longo, the sick grandfather evicted from the home he had squatted in for 21 years, in season 3's episode 9, "Let God Sort 'Em Out".
 Aaron Paul as a gay teenager in the season one episode "The Men from the Boys"
 Chloë Grace Moretz as Violet in the season three episodes "The Watchers" and "Blood in, Blood Out". This was her first ever acting role.
 Danielle Panabaker as Samantha Gray in the season three episode "The Daughter-Father Dance", for which she won a Young Artist Award for Best Performance in a TV Series—Guest Starring Young Actress.
 Anna Gunn as Meghan Barstow, a lawyer for a pharmaceutical firm in season one episodes "Home" and "Reunion".
 Viola Davis as Suzanna Clemons' attorney in the season one episode "The Men from the Boys".
 Kerry Washington as Drea Westbrook, a client in the season two episode "The Next Life".
 Jesse Plemons as Lawrence Neal, a disabled child in the season one episode "Paternity".

Production and location

The show was set in Pittsburgh, Pennsylvania, and was filmed in the city from time to time. Beginning in season 2, the theme song was "Empire in My Mind" performed by The Wallflowers. The fictional offices of Legal Services of Pittsburgh are located at 121–123 Seventh Street, Pittsburgh, while Fallin & Fallin's offices are located in the Frick Building, 437 Grant Street, Pittsburgh.

Home media
CBS DVD (distributed by Paramount Home Entertainment) has released all three seasons of The Guardian on DVD in region 1.

On February 6, 2018, CBS Home Entertainment released The Guardian-The Complete Series on DVD in region 1.

CBS/Paramount controls video rights only in the USA (where CBS Television Distribution has ancillary rights). Outside the US, Sony Pictures Television controls distribution rights, and international DVD releases will be mostly from Sony Pictures Home Entertainment.

In Germany Koch Media has released the first two seasons on DVD and Blu-ray.

Awards

References

External links 
 
 

CBS original programming
2000s American drama television series
2001 American television series debuts
2004 American television series endings
2000s American legal television series
American legal drama television series
English-language television shows
Television series by CBS Studios
Television series by Sony Pictures Television
Television shows set in Pittsburgh
Television shows filmed in Los Angeles
Fictional portrayals of the Pittsburgh Bureau of Police